The Legend of Hang Tuah is a 1956 Singaporean historical drama film directed by Phani Majumdar. It is the first Malay film to be fully shot in Eastman colour film. It was released to public on 28 January 1956. The film was based on the legendary Admiral Hang Tuah of Malacca and his 4 sworn brothers; Hang Jebat, Hang Kasturi, Hang Lekir and Hang Lekiu. This film received the award for 'Best Musical Score' at the 3rd Asian Film Festival in Hong Kong in 1956 and an official screening at 7th Berlin International Film Festival in 1957, where it was nominated for the Golden Bear.

Plot
Tuah and four of his best friends, Jebat, Kasturi, Lekir and Lekiu, while still teenagers have shown their heroism beating the pirates at sea. And as adults, as proposed by Tuah, they went to Mount Ledang to study with Tok Guru Adi. As a student, Tuah met a native girl, Melor. In his meeting with Hang Tuah, Melor had shown a deep affection towards Hang Tuah and vice versa. After completing his studies and with sufficient knowledge, Tuah and his four friends return to Malacca and with a difficult parting done, Tuah promises to wait for Melor if she comes looking for him in Malacca later.

In Malacca, the five friends save the life of the Bendahara Dato' Tun Perak from an angry mob when he was on his way for an audience with Sultan Mansur Shah - the ruler of Malacca. Following the courage shown in front of the eyes of the Tun Perak himself, Hang Tuah and his four comrades are appointed by the Sultan as warriors, garnering envy from some state dignitaries including Tun Ali.

Shortly after the appointment, the Sultan of Malacca leaves for Majapahit to marry Raden Mas Ayu and he is accompanied by Hang Tuah and his friends. There, in a ceremony, their strength is challenged by a renowned warrior named Taming Sari. Having fought tooth and nail with Taming Sari, Hang Tuah demonstrated his expertise, proving his weapon can also beat Taming Sari's when Hang Tuah knew Taming Sari's strength lies in his weapon. With Taming Sari's death, his magic keris is presented to Hang Tuah which increases the latter's power and strength.

After some time later, Sultan Mansur Shah expresses his disappointment in being unable to marry Tun Teja as she was engaged to Megat Panji Alam. And to redeem her for the Sultan, Hang Tuah secretly goes to Pahang with the aim of bringing Tun Teja back. As Hang Tuah leaves for Malacca, Melor comes in search of him. She runs into Tun Ali and Pateh Karma Wijaya. However, she is spared from their grasps by tricking them into thinking she is a handmaiden.

In Pahang, with Hang Tuah ruse succeeding in courting Tun Tijah, she breaks off the marriage to Megat Panji Alam. But on the ship, Hang Tuah reveals the fact that he came to Pahang just to bring Tun Teja to Malacca to marry the Sultan. Tun Teja is disappointed yet accepts the situation while willing to forgo her love to Hang Tuah.

Hang Tuah is caught between his loyalty to the Sultan and his love for Melor, since the latter has become a palace handmaiden and belongs to the Sultan. He finally agrees to meet Melor after persuaded by Dang Rani (on the command of Tun Ali and Pateh Karma Wijaya) This meeting consequently was witnessed by the Sultan, just as Tun Ali and Pateh Karma Wijaya had planned. The Sultan orders for the execution of Hang Tuah as being in close relations to a palace handmaiden is an act of treason according to palace laws.

With Hang Tuah gone, his sacred Taming Sari kris is presented to the Sultan who then awards it to Hang Jebat, now assigned to take Tuah's place. However, Jebat considers the Sultan's punishment as unfair given that there is not enough proof to support claims of Tuah's wrongdoing. Thus, he vows to avenge his best friend.

In a ceremony celebrating the birthday of Pateh Karma Wijaya, Melor decides to avenge Tuah's death by killing Pateh Karma Wijaya with a kerambit hidden in her hair bun during a dance performed for him. However, Melor is also killed by a spear thrown by a guard.

Hang Jebat goes ahead with plans to avenge the death of Hang Tuah even with the opposition of Hang Kasturi, Hang Lekir and Hang Lekiu. He goes on a rampage in the Sultan's palace causing many casualties. Due to that, the Sultan of Malacca had to flee leaving the castle and settle in the home of Bendahara.

Sultan of Melaka voices his anger and shame as not one of his ministers and admirals dared to stand up to Hang Jebat. The Sultan then expresses his regret on ordering the execution of Hang Tuah as he may be the only one able to match Jebat's skills in combat. Upon hearing this, Tun Perak exposes the secret that he did not kill Hang Tuah as ordered to him but instead kept Tuah hidden in a prison cell. Immediately, the sultan ordered Hang Tuah be brought to him to be pardoned.

Hang Tuah was brought by the Bendahara for an audience with the Sultan. Hang Tuah requests the kris of Taming Sari be returned to him so he could kill Jebat with it. The sultan regretfully replies that the keris is in Jebat's hands. The Sultan offers his inheritance kris to Hang Tuah instead. Tuah humbly declines, telling the Sultan that with the heirloom kris he will not be able to hurt Jebat wielding the magical Taming Sari, much less kill him.

Tuah then proceeds to the Sultan's palace where Jebat is resting. Standing in front of the palace, Tuah challenges Jebat to a fight much to the latter's surprise. Trying to persuade his best friend, Jebat swears that he is only doing this out of loyalty to Tuah and avenge the mistreatment given to him by the Sultan. But Tuah is not to be dissuaded and insists on killing Jebat. Reluctantly, Jebat allows his once good friend to come up to the palace and fight with him.

As the fight goes on Tuah is unable to hurt Jebat with the Taming Sari in the latter's possession. Seeing how Tuah is so determined to kill him, Jebat willingly trades their kerises with Tuah and resumes their fight. This time, Hang Tuah is able to stab Hang Jebat who then dies in Tuah's arms.

After this event, the Sultan awards Hang Tuah with the title of Laksamana. As the whole of Malacca celebrates Tuah's inauguration, Tuah sits at home saddened about both Melor and Jebat meeting their demise for avenging him while he is still alive. Hang Tuah then questions himself on whether he is right for his utmost loyalty to the Sultan or is Jebat right for standing up to an unjust Sultan.

Cast
 P. Ramlee as Hang Tuah
 Saadiah as Melor
 Ahmad Mahmud as Hang Jebat
 Zaiton as Tun Teja
 Haji Mahadi as Sultan Mansur Syah
 Daeng Idris as Dato' Bendahara Tun Perak
 Yusof Latiff as Tun Mat
 Nordin Ahmad as Hang Kasturi
 S. Shamsuddin as Hang Lekir
 Aziz Sattar as Hang Lekiu
 Hashim Nur as Adiputra
 Siti Tanjung Perak as Dang Merduai
 Mariani as Dang Rani
 Saamah as Dang Ratna
 Hashimah Yon as Javanese Dancer
 Mustarjo as King Of Majapahit 
 Rahman Rahmat as Hang Tuah, during Childhood 
 S. Sudarmaji as Ketua Orang Jakun
 Udo Omar as Tun Ali 
 Malik Sutan Muda as Taming Sari 
 Mustapha Maarof as Tun Zainal
 S. Kadarisman as Pateh Karma Wijaya
 Salleh Kamil as Orang Mengamuk 1 (Cameo)
 A. Rahim as Orang Mengamuk 2 (Cameo)
 Omar Suwita as Orang Mengamuk 3 (Cameo)
 Ahmad C as Orang Mengamuk 4 (Cameo)
 Nyak Osman (Cameo)
 H. M. Busra (Cameo)
 Mat Sentol as Pahang Palace Dancer (Cameo)

Songs
 Berkorban Apa Saja, performed by P. Ramlee
 Joget Tari Lenggang

Reception
Hang Tuah was released in many countries outside of Malaya, and won awards in Hong Kong. In Malaya, Hang Tuah faced disapproval from Malay activists because of what they perceived as pro-colonial sentiments in the film. The plot’s emphasis on its hero’s “blind loyalty” was criticized, as was its Indian and non-Muslim director, Phani Majumdar. Hang Tuah was not seen as Malay enough, because of what were perceived as particularly Indian elements to the film – particularly its musical sequences.

Famous quotes from the film
 "Raja Adil Raja Disembah,Raja Zalim Raja Disanggah" ("A fair king is a ruler to be obeyed, a cruel king is a despot to be revolted")
 "Takkan Melayu Hilang di Dunia" ("Never shall the Malay race vanish from the face of the Earth") - this quote would later become a famous rallying cry for Malay nationalism.

See also
 P.Ramlee

References

External links
 
 Hang Tuah / 1956 - Filem Malaysia
 Hang Tuah (1956) at the Singapore Film Locations Archive
 Hang Tuah,sinemamalaysia.com

Malaysian historical drama films
Singaporean drama films
1956 films
Films directed by Phani Majumdar
Films scored by P. Ramlee
Malay Film Productions films
Films shot in Singapore
Films set in the 15th century
Films set in Asia
Historical epic films